Saint Vincent and the Grenadines competed at the 2011 World Aquatics Championships in Shanghai, China between July 16 and 31, 2011.

Swimming

Saint Vincent and the Grenadines qualified 1 swimmer.

Men

References

Nations at the 2011 World Aquatics Championships
2011 in Saint Vincent and the Grenadines
Saint Vincent and the Grenadines at the World Aquatics Championships